Interstate 85 (I-85) is a major Interstate Highway in the Southeastern United States. Its southern terminus is at an interchange with I-65 in Montgomery, Alabama; its northern terminus is an interchange with I-95 in Petersburg, Virginia, near Richmond. It is nominally north–south as it carries an odd number, but it is physically oriented northeast–southwest and covers a larger east-west span than north-south. While most Interstates that end in a "5" are cross-country, I-85 is primarily a regional route serving five southeastern states: Virginia, North Carolina, South Carolina, Georgia, and Alabama. 

Major metropolitan areas served by I-85 include the Greater Richmond Region in Virginia, the Research Triangle, Piedmont Triad, and Charlotte metropolitan area regions of North Carolina, Upstate South Carolina, the Atlanta metropolitan area in Georgia, and the Montgomery metropolitan area in Alabama. There are plans to extend I-85 along the US Route 80 (US 80) corridor into Mississippi. Because of its unusually diagonal nature, portions of I-85 are to the west of I-75, which puts I-85 out of the Interstate grid.

Route description

|-
|AL
|
|-
|GA
|
|-
|SC
|
|-
|NC
|
|-
|VA
|
|-
|Total
|
|}
I-85 is a route that serves several major locations in the Southeastern United States, stretching from Alabama to Virginia serving major metropolitan areas such as Atlanta and Charlotte.

Alabama

I-85 begins as a T intersection off I-65 in Montgomery. From there, I-85 parallels US 80 until the highway nears Tuskegee. At Tuskegee, I-85 leaves US 80 and starts to parallel US 29, which the highway parallels for much of its length.

I-85 also passes near Auburn, Opelika, Valley, and Lanett before crossing the Chattahoochee River into Georgia.

I-85 is planned to be rerouted southward just east of Montgomery, where it will intersect with I-65 just south of downtown Montgomery and then have a future southern terminus at the concurrency of I-20/I-59 just northeast of Cuba. Future I-685 will be the new designation for the route of current I-85, which leads directly to I-65 in downtown Montgomery.

Georgia 

In Georgia, I-85 (unsigned State Route 403 [SR 403]) bypasses West Point before coming into the LaGrange area. East of LaGrange, I-85 intersects I-185 which connects to Columbus and Fort Benning. In the Atlanta area, I-85 intersects I-20 and merges with I-75 (Downtown Connector) through the downtown area. North of Atlanta, I-985 provides a link to Gainesville before heading through northeastern Georgia and then crossing into South Carolina.

South Carolina

I-85 provides the major transportation route for the Upstate of South Carolina, linking together the major centers of Greenville and Spartanburg with regional centers of importance. In Spartanburg, BMW has a major manufacturing plant that can be seen from the highway. In South Carolina, I-85 bypasses Clemson and Anderson on the way to Greenville. Beginning at Anderson, I-85 widens from four to six lanes. Near Powdersville, US 29 joins I-85 and they run concurrently until they cross the Saluda River. I-85 bypasses just south of Greenville but provides two links into the city via spur routes I-185 and I-385. 

I-85 also has direct exits to Greenville–Spartanburg International Airport, which serves the Greenville–Spartanburg metropolitan area. I-85 then bypasses the city of Spartanburg to the north. Its original route is now signed as I-85 Business (I-85 Bus) and was approved by the American Association of State Highway and Transportation Officials (AASHTO) on April 22, 1995. Near milemarker 70, I-85 intersects with I-26. The exits are signed as exits 70A for eastbound traffic and 70B for westbound traffic. North of Spartanburg, I-85 narrows from six lanes back to four lanes and bypasses Gaffney. Much of the terrain between Spartanburg and the North Carolina border is rural in nature but congested to the state line due to its location near Charlotte.

North Carolina

In North Carolina, I-85 enters a relatively rural area near Kings Mountain before entering the Gastonia and Charlotte areas. In Charlotte, I-85 bypasses Charlotte Douglas International Airport and turns northeastward just before reaching Uptown Charlotte; thus, I-85 just bypasses uptown to the north where it junctions with I-77. North of Charlotte, the highway passes near Concord, Salisbury, Lexington, and High Point before reaching Greensboro. 

At Greensboro, I-85 shifts away from downtown I-85 Bus (old I-85 through town). I-85 then joins I-40 east of downtown, and the two highways are cosigned as they pass through Burlington, Graham, and Mebane then separate near Hillsborough where I-40 turns toward Chapel Hill, Cary, and Raleigh. After the split with I-40, I-85 continues to Durham, before turning northeastward through Oxford then Henderson toward Virginia.

Virginia

Starting from the Virginia border, the route passes South Hill and McKenney before heading into a large forest. After the forest, I-85 reaches Petersburg and ends at I-95. The highway is briefly cosigned with US 460 from a few miles west of Petersburg in Dinwiddie County to I-95. I-85 follows the same general path as US 1 (Boydton Plank Road and Jefferson Davis Highway), as the two cross several times between the North Carolina border and the northern terminus outside Petersburg.

History

In the northern half of I-85, the route roughly parallels an ancient Indian trading path documented since colonial times from Petersburg, Virginia, to the Catawba Indian territory.

I-85 near Petersburg once formed the southern end of the Richmond–Petersburg Turnpike, which was completed in 1958. The tolls were removed in 1992 after I-295 was completed.

I-40 ran with I-85 along the bypass to the southern/western end and I-40 continued on a new freeway alignment at exit 121 until September 2008, when it was rerouted back to its old alignment through the city. Despite its reroute around Greensboro, the overall length for I-85 in North Carolina remains the same as before.
 
On the evening of March 30, 2017 a massive fire collapsed a bridge on I-85 in Atlanta.

Future

An extension of I-85 has been proposed west from Montgomery to intersect I-20/I-59 just east of the Mississippi–Alabama state line, where it will connect with I-20/I-59 near Cuba, Alabama. This extension will roughly follow the route of US 80, going through or bypassing Selma and Demopolis. The Federal Highway Administration (FHWA) approved the alignment on February 17, 2011, after AASHTO approved at its Fall 2010 meeting in Biloxi, Mississippi. Also approved was the proposal to redesignate part of existing I-85 south and east of Montgomery to be bypassed as part of the extension of I-85 as I-685. Alabama has permission to cosign this part of I-85 as I-685 until the new alignment is built. This section is also envisioned by some as part of a proposed I-14. If this extension were to be completed, I-85 and I-20 would meet each other twice.

I-85 is scheduled to have several new auxiliary routes in the future. I-785 is planned by the North Carolina Department of Transportation (NCDOT) to run from Greensboro to Danville, Virginia. The proposed route would follow the current US 29 corridor. I-885 is also planned by NCDOT to run from I-40 to I-85 in the Durham area, following North Carolina Highway 147 (NC 147), the under-construction East End Connector, and US 70.

There are plans for I-85 from Anderson County to Spartanburg County, South Carolina, to become four to five lanes in each direction including high-occupancy vehicle lanes (HOV lanes).

There are also plans in Georgia for I-85 to have three lanes in each direction from the state line in Hart County to meet up with the newly expanded portions just outside of the Atlanta metropolitan area in Jackson County.

Major junctions
Alabama
  in Montgomery
Georgia
  near LaGrange
  near College Park; I-85 intersects this highway twice.
  in Atlanta; the two highways run concurrently through much of the city.
  in Atlanta
  near Buford
South Carolina
  near Greenville
  near Greenville
  near Spartanburg
  near Spartanburg via I-85 Business Loop; An extension is currently underway that will extend I-585 to I-85.
North Carolina
  around Charlotte; I-85 intersects I-485 twice.
  in Charlotte
  in Lexington
  in Greensboro
  in Greensboro; they run concurrently until Hillsborough, North Carolina.
Virginia
  in Petersburg

Related routes

I-85 Bus in Lexington and High Point, North Carolina.
I-85 Bus in Spartanburg, South Carolina.

See also

 Death Valley (North Carolina)
 I-85 Rivalry
Piedmont Atlantic Megaregion the megalopolis that largely follows I-85
Southeast High Speed Rail Corridor
Charlanta

References

External links

 

Interstate 85
85
085